Harry Delmar's Revels was a Broadway revue that ran from Nov 28, 1927 - Mar 1928 for 112 performances. It was produced by Samuel Baerwitz and Harry Delmar. The music is by Jimmy Monaco, Jesse Greer, and Lester Lee.  The book is by William K. Wells and the lyrics are by Billy Rose and Ballard MacDonald.

Featured players
Hugh Cameron
Glen Dale
Frank Fay
William Gaston
Patsy Kelly
Bert Lahr and Mercedes Delpino
Winnie Lightner
Ivan Triesault

Songs
 Four Walls
 Golden Memories of Perfume
 I Love a Man in a Uniform
 The Jigaboo Jig
 Laff 'Em Away
 Limbs of the Law
 My Rainbow
 Nagasaki
 Say It with a Solitaire

The well-known standard I Can't Give You Anything But Love by Jimmy McHugh and Dorothy Fields was cut before the opening. It was later used for Lew Leslie's Blackbirds of 1928.

References

Broadway musicals
Revues